Don Alejandro Groizard y Gómez de la Serna (18 June 1830 – 5 September 1919) was a Spanish noble and politician who served as Minister of State between 1894 and 1895.

|-

Foreign ministers of Spain
Knights of the Golden Fleece
1830 births
1919 deaths
Liberal Party (Spain, 1880) politicians
Justice ministers of Spain
Presidents of the Senate of Spain